"Pégate" (English: "Get Closer") is the second single from Ricky Martin's first live album, MTV Unplugged (2006). It was released on December 19, 2006. The song was written by Martin, Roy Tavaré and Tommy Torres, and produced by Torres.

Composition
The song is a traditional plena rhythm, a popular Puerto Rican genre played with three hand held drums or tambourines, among other instruments. In "Pégate", the traditional plena drums are played by the percussionists of the band Viento de Agua, led by Tito Matos. Cuatro, a traditional string instrument from Puerto Rico, is played by Christian Nieves.

Chart performance
In the United States, "Pégate" peaked at number eleven on Billboards Hot Latin Songs and at number nine on Latin Pop Airplay and Tropical Songs. It also reached number twenty-five on Latin Rhythm Airplay. With the help of remixes by Ralphi Rosario, "Pégate" also peaked at number six on the Dance Club Songs chart. In Spain, the song reached number thirteen on the Digital Singles Chart. In Mexico, the digital single was certified 4× Platinum for sales of over 400,000 copies.

Awards
"Pégate" won the ASCAP Latin Award in category Pop/Ballad Winning Song and also won the BMI Latin Award.

Formats and track listingsUS promotional CD single"Pégate" (Radio Edit) – 3:10
"Pégate" (Album Version) – 4:05US promotional CD maxi-single'
"Pégate" (Ralphi Rosario Radio Mix) – 3:58
"Pégate" (Ralphi Rosario Hard Club Vox) – 8:25
"Pégate" (Ralphi's Dirty Dub) – 13:39
"Pégate" (Ralphi Rosario Radio Mix - Instrumental) – 3:58
"Pégate" (Ralphi Rosario Hard Club Vox - Instrumental) - 8:21
"Pégate" (Echo & Diesel Remix) – 3:37

Charts and certifications

Weekly charts

Year-end charts

Certifications and sales

References

2006 singles
Ricky Martin songs
Spanish-language songs
2006 songs
Columbia Records singles
Live singles